Warren Neidel (born 9 March 1980) is a retired Namibian football defender.

References

1980 births
Living people
Namibian men's footballers
Namibia international footballers
Chief Santos players
Orlando Pirates S.C. players
SK Windhoek players
Black Africa S.C. players
Association football defenders
People from Tsumeb